Belson Run is a  long 1st order tributary to Sewickley Creek in Westmoreland County, Pennsylvania.  This is the only stream of this name in the United States.

Course
Belson Run rises about 0.5 miles north of Central, Pennsylvania, and then flows northwest to join Sewickley Creek at Hunker.

Watershed
Belson Run drains  of area, receives about 41.4 in/year of precipitation, has a wetness index of 416.98, and is about 37% forested.

References

 
Tributaries of the Ohio River
Rivers of Pennsylvania
Rivers of Westmoreland County, Pennsylvania
Allegheny Plateau